Ittireddu is a comune (municipality) in the Province of Sassari in the Italian region Sardinia, located about  north of Cagliari and about  southeast of Sassari.

Ittireddu borders the following municipalities: Bonorva, Mores, Nughedu San Nicolò, Ozieri.

Sights include the church of Santa Croce, an example of Byzantine-Romanesque architecture (9th-13th centuries).

Twin towns
 Fiorano Modenese, Italy
 Maranello, Italy

References

External links
Official website

Cities and towns in Sardinia